High Priest ( or) was the title of the chief religious official of Judaism from the early post-Exilic times until the destruction of the Second Temple in Jerusalem by the Romans in 70 CE. Previously, in the Israelite religion, including during the time of the kingdoms of Israel and Judah, other terms were used to designate the leading priests; however, as long as a king was in place, the supreme ecclesiastical authority lay with him. The official introduction of the term "high priest" went hand-in-hand with a greatly enhanced ritual and political significance bestowed upon the chief priest of the Israelites in the post-Exilic period, especially from 411 BCE onward due to the religious transformations brought about during the time of the Babylonian captivity and due to the lack of a Jewish king and kingdom.

The high priests belonged to the Jewish priestly families that trace their paternal line back to Aaron—the first high priest of Israel in the Hebrew Bible and elder brother of Moses—through Zadok, a leading priest at the time of the reigns of David and Solomon over the United Kingdom of Israel. This tradition came to an end in the 2nd century BCE during the rule of the Hasmoneans, when the position was occupied by other priestly families unrelated to Zadok.

Predecessors of Aaron
Even though Aaron was the first high priest mentioned in the Book of Exodus, Louis Ginzberg in Legends of the Jews noted that in legends the first man that assumed the title of high priest of God is Enoch, who was succeeded by Methuselah, Lamech, Noah, Shem, Melchizedek, Abraham, Isaac and Levi.

Biblical narrative

Aaron, though he is but rarely called "the great priest", being generally simply designated as "ha-kohen" (the priest), was the first incumbent of the office, to which he was appointed by God (Book of Exodus).

Succession
The succession was to be through one of his sons, and was to remain in his own family. If he had no son, the office devolved upon the brother next of age: such appears to have been the practice in the Hasmonean period. In the time of Eli, however, the office passed to the collateral branch of Ithamar (see Eleazar). But King Solomon is reported to have deposed the high priest Abiathar, and to have appointed Zadok, a descendant of Eleazar, in his stead. After the Exile, the succession seems to have been, at first, in a direct line from father to son; but later the civil authorities arrogated to themselves the right of appointment. Antiochus IV Epiphanes for instance, deposed Onias III in favor of Jason, who was followed by Menelaus.

Herod the Great nominated no less than six high priests; Archelaus, two. The Roman legate Quirinius and his successors exercised the right of appointment, as did Agrippa I, Herod of Chalcis, and Agrippa II. Even the people occasionally elected candidates to the office. The high priests before the Exile were, it seems, appointed for life; in fact, from Aaron to the Captivity the number of the high priests was not greater than during the sixty years preceding the fall of the Second Temple.

Age and qualifications
The age of eligibility for the office is not fixed in the Law; but according to rabbinical tradition it was twenty. Aristobulus, however, was only seventeen when appointed by Herod the Great; but the son of Onias III was too young (νηπιος) to succeed his father. The age a Levite entered the priesthood was 30 years of age (Numbers ).

Legitimacy of birth and lineage was essential, hence the care in keeping genealogical records and distrust of one whose mother had been captured in war. He may marry only an Israelite virgin. In  this restriction is extended to all kohanim (priests), an exception being the widow of a priest (see Levirate marriage). 

The high priest also strictly avoided ritual defilement. According to  he was not to come in contact with the bodies of the dead, not even those of his parents; regular priests may become ritually unclean for the death of an immediate relative. He was also forbidden, as a sign of mourning, to leave his hair dishevelled or exposed, or to rend his garments ( et seq.). According to Josephus, birth on foreign soil was no disqualification; but the disqualifications in  et seq. applied to the high priest and other priests.

Vestments

The Torah provides for specific vestments to be worn by the priests when they are ministering in the Tabernacle: "And you shall make holy garments for Aaron your brother, for dignity and for beauty". The high priest wore eight holy garments (bigdei kodesh). Of these, four were of the same type worn by all priests and four were unique to the Kohen Gadol.

Those vestments which were common to all priests, were:
 Priestly undergarments (Hebrew michnasayim) (breeches): linen pants reaching from the waist to the knees "to cover their nakedness"
 Priestly tunic (Hebrew ketonet) (tunic): made of pure linen, covering the entire body from the neck to the feet, with sleeves reaching to the wrists. That of the high priest was embroidered; those of the priests were plain.
 Priestly sash (Hebrew avnet) (sash): that of the high priest was of fine linen with "embroidered work" in blue and purple and scarlet; those worn by the priests were of white, twined linen.
 Priestly turban (Hebrew mitznefet): that of the high priest was much larger than that of the priests and wound so that it formed a broad, flat-topped turban; that for priests was wound so that it formed a cone-shaped turban, called a migbahat.

The vestments that were unique to the high priest were:
 Priestly robe (me'il) ("robe of the ephod"): a sleeveless, blue robe, the lower hem of which was fringed with small golden bells alternating with pomegranate-shaped tassels in blue, purple, and scarlet—tekhelet, argaman (purple), tolaat shani.
 Ephod: a richly embroidered vest or apron with two onyx engraved gemstones on the shoulders, on which were engraved the names of the tribes of Israel
 Priestly breastplate (Hebrew hoshen): with twelve gems, each engraved with the name of one of the tribes; a pouch in which he probably carried the Urim and Thummim. It was fastened to the Ephod
 On the front of the turban was a golden plate inscribed with the words: "Holiness unto YHWH" attached to the mitznefet.

The high priest, like all priests, would minister barefoot when he was serving in the Temple. Like all of the priests, he had to immerse himself in the ritual bath before vesting and wash his hands and his feet before performing any sacred act. The Talmud teaches that neither the kohanim nor the Kohen Gadol were fit to minister unless they wore their priestly vestments: "While they are clothed in the priestly garments, they are clothed in the priesthood; but when they are not wearing the garments, the priesthood is not upon them" (B.Zevachim 17:B). It is further taught that just as the sacrifices facilitate an atonement for sin, so do the priestly garments (B.Zevachim 88b). The high priest had two sets of holy garments: the "golden garments" detailed above, and a set of white "linen garments" (bigdei ha-bad) which he wore only on the Day of Atonement (Yom Kippur).  On that day, he would change his holy garments four times, beginning in the golden garments but changing into the Linen Garments for the two moments when he would enter the Holy of Holies (the first time to offer the blood of atonement and the incense, and the second time to retrieve the censer), and then change back again into the golden garments after each time.  He would immerse in the ritual bath before each change of garments, washing his hands and his feet after removing the garments and again before putting the other set on. The linen garments were only four in number, those corresponding to the garments worn by all priests (undergarments, tunic, sash and turban), but made only of white linen, with no embroidery. They could be worn only once, new sets being made each year.

Consecration
The ceremony of consecration, extending through an entire week (-), included certain rites which all priests were required to undergo: purification; the sacrifices; the "filling" of the hands; the smearing with blood. But Aaron the high priest was anointed with sacred oil, hence the title of the "anointed priest"; other passages have it that all priests were anointed.

The first consecration was performed by Moses; the Torah does not state who consecrated subsequent high priests.  states emphatically that every new high priest shall be anointed; and  et seq. commands that the official garments worn by his predecessor shall be worn by the new incumbent while he is anointed and during the seven days of his consecration (comp. ; Psalm 133:2).

Sanctity and functions
The distinguished rank of the high priest is apparent from the fact that his sins are regarded as belonging also to the people (Lev. iv. 3, 22). He was entrusted with the stewardship of the Urim and Thummim (Num. xxvii. 20 et seq.). On Yom Kippur he alone entered the Holy of Holies, to make atonement for his house and for the people. He alone could offer the sacrifices for the sins of the priests, or of the people, or of himself; and only he could officiate at the sacrifices following his own or another priest's consecration. He also offered a meal-offering every morning and evening for himself and the whole body of the priesthood (though the wording of the law is not altogether definite). Other information concerning his functions is not given. Though other priests would serve only when it was their week on rotation and on feast days (and even then their function was decided by lot), he was privileged to take part at his own pleasure in any of the priestly rites at any time. Josephus contends that the high priest almost invariably participated in the ceremonies on Shabbat, the New Moon, and the festivals. This may also be inferred from the glowing description given in the Wisdom of Sirach i. of the high priest's appearance at the altar.

In rabbinical literature
The high priest is the chief of all the priests; he should be anointed and invested with the pontifical garments; but if the sacred oil were not obtainable, investiture with the additional garments (see Biblical Data, above) is regarded as sufficient. A high priest so invested is known as merubbeh begadim. This investiture consists of arraying him in the eight pieces of dress and in removing them again on eight successive days, though (the anointing and) the investiture on the first day suffices to qualify him for the functions of the office. The only distinction between the "anointed" and the "invested" high priest is that the former offers the bull for an unintentional transgression.

Powers
The Great Sanhedrin alone had the right to appoint, or confirm the appointment of, the high priest. His consecration might take place only in the day-time. Two high priests must not be appointed together. Every high priest had a "mishneh" (a second) called the Segan, or "memunneh", to stand at his right; another assistant was the "Catholicos" ("Yad", l.c. 16–17). The right of succession was in the direct, or, the direct failing, the collateral, line, provided the conditions concerning physical fitness were fulfilled (ib. 20; Ket. 103b; Sifra, Ḳedoshim).

For offenses which entailed flagellation, the high priest could be sentenced by a court of three; after submitting to the penalty he could resume his office ("Yad", l.c. 22). The high priest was expected to be superior to all other priests in physique, in wisdom, in dignity, and in material wealth; if he was poor his brother priests contributed to make him rich (Yoma 18a; "Yad", l.c. v. 1); but none of these conditions was indispensable.

The high priest was required to be mindful of his honor. He might not mingle with the common people, nor permit himself to be seen disrobed, or in a public bath, etc.; but he might invite others to bathe with him (Tosef., Sanh. iv.; "Yad", l.c. v. 3). He might not participate in a public banquet, but he might pay a visit of consolation to mourners, though even then his dignity was guarded by prescribed etiquette (Sanh. 18–19; "Yad", l.c. v. 4).

Restrictions
The high priest might not follow the bier of one in his own family who had died, nor leave the Temple or his house during the time of mourning. The people visited him to offer consolation; in receiving them, the Segan was at his right, the next in rank and the people at his left. The people said: "We are thy atonement." He answered: "Be ye blessed from heaven" ("Yad", l.c. v. 5; and Mishneh Kesef, ad loc.). During the offering of consolation he sat on a stool, the people on the floor; he rent his garments, not from above, but from below, near the feet, the penalty for rending them from above being flagellation (Semag, Lawin, 61-62). He could not permit his hair to be disheveled, nor could he cut it ("Yad", l.c. v. 6). He had one house attached to the Temple (Mid. 71b), and another in the city of Jerusalem. His honor required that he should spend most of his time in the Sanctuary ("Yad", l.c. v. 7). The high priest was subject to the jurisdiction of the courts, but if accused of a crime entailing capital punishment he was tried by the Great Sanhedrin; he could, however, refuse to give testimony (Sanh. 18).

The high priest must be married, and "should only marry a virgin"; to guard against contingencies it was proposed to hold a second wife in readiness immediately before the Day of Atonement (Yoma i. 1); but polygamy on his part was not encouraged ( = "one wife"; Yoma 13a; "Yad", l.c. v. 10). He could give the "halizah", and it could be given to his widow, as she also was subject to the Levirate; his divorced wife could marry again (l.c.; Sanh. 18). When entering the Temple ("Hekal") he was supported to the curtain by three men (Tamid 67a; this may perhaps have reference to his entering the Holy of Holies; but see "Yad", l.c. v. 11, and the Mishneh Kesef ad loc.). He could take part in the service whenever he desired ("Yad", l.c. v. 12; Yoma i. 2; Tamid 67b; see Rashi ad loc.). On the Day of Atonement only he wore white garments, while on other occasions he wore his golden vestments (Yoma 60a; comp. 68b). The seven days preceding the Day of Atonement were devoted to preparing for his high function, precautions being taken to prevent any accident that might render him Levitically impure (Yoma i. 1 et seq.). The ceremonial for that day is described in detail in Mishnah Yoma (see also Haneberg, "Die Religiösen Alterthümer der Bibel", pp. 659–671, Munich, 1869). For other regulations concerning the high priest see "Yad", Biat ha-Miḳdash, ii. 1, 8; for details in regard to the vestments see "Yad", Kele ha-Miḳdash, viii. 2-4, 5 (in reference to soiled vestments: the white could be worn only once); l.c. vii. 1 ("ẓiẓ"), vii. 3 ("me'il"), vii. 6 ("ḥoshen"), vii. 9 (ephod), ix.

Josephus enumerates only fifty-two pontificates under the Second Temple, omitting the second appointments of Hyrcanus II, Hananeel, and Joazar.

Post-Exilic conditions

After the Babylonian Exile, Joshua appears vested with the prominence that the Priestly source (P) ascribes to the high priest (Zech. iii.; Hag. vi. 13).  The post-exilic high priests traced their pedigree back to Zadok, appointed as chief priest at Jerusalem by Solomon (I Kings ii. 35), and Zadok was held to be a descendant of Eleazar, the son of Aaron (II Chron. v. 34). Immediately after the return from the Captivity, as is clearly to be inferred from Zechariah and Haggai, political authority was not vested in the high priest. Political (Messianic) sovereignty was represented by, or attributed to, a member of the royal house, while religious affairs were reserved to the high-priesthood, represented in the Book of Zechariah by Joshua. But in the course of time, as the Messianic hope, or even the hope of autonomy under foreign (Persian, Greek, Egyptian, or Syrian) suzerainty became weaker, the high priest also became a political chief of the congregation, as much, perhaps, through the consideration shown him by the suzerain powers and their viceroys as through the effect of the increasingly thorough acceptance of the Levitical code by pious Judeans. The rigorists received Alcimus, the high priest, with confidence because he was "a priest of the seed of Aaron." (I Macc. vii. 14)

Political aspects
The assumption of the princely authority by the Maccabean high priests (the Hasmoneans) was merely the final link in this development, which, beginning with the death of Zerubbabel, was to combine the two ideals, the politico-Messianic and the religio-Levitical, in one office. But after the brief heyday of national independence had come to an inglorious close, the high-priesthood changed again in character, insofar as it ceased to be a hereditary and a life office. High priests were appointed and removed with great frequency (see above). This may account for the otherwise strange use of the title in the plural (ἀρχιερεῖς) in the New Testament and in Josephus ("Vita", § 38; "B. J." ii. 12, § 6; iv. 3, §§ 7, 9; iv. 4, § 3). The deposed high priests seem to have retained the title, and to have continued to exercise certain functions; the ministration on the Day of Atonement, however, may have been reserved for the actual incumbent. This, however, is not clear; Hor. iii. 1–4 mentions as distinctive the exclusive sacrifice of a bull by the high priest on the Day of Atonement and the tenth of the ephah (that is, the twelve "ḥallot"; comp. Meg. i. 9; Macc. ii. 6). But even in the latest periods the office was restricted to a few families of great distinction (probably the bene kohanim gedolim, "[members of] high-priestly families"; Ket. xiii. 1-2; Oh. xvii. 5; comp. Josephus, "B. J." vi. 2, § 2; see Schürer, "Gesch." 3d ed., ii. 222). 001

Connection with Sanhedrin
The high priest was the presiding officer of the Sanhedrin. This view conflicts with the later Jewish tradition according to which the Pharisee tannaim (the Zugot) at the head of the yeshivot presided over the great Sanhedrin also (Ḥag. ii. 2). However, a careful reading of the sources ("Ant." xx. 10; "Contra Ap." ii., § 22; comp. "Ant." iv. 8, § 14; xiv. 9, §§ 3–5 [Hyrcanus II. as president]; xx. 9, § 1 [Ananus]), as well as the fact that in the post-Maccabean period the high priest was looked upon as exercising in all things, political, legal, and sacerdotal, the supreme authority, shows it to be almost certain that the presidency of the Sanhedrin was vested in the high priest (see Isidore Loeb in "R. E. J." 1889, xix. 188–201; Jelski, "Die Innere Einrichtung des Grossen Synhedrions", pp. 22–28, according to whom the Nasi was the high priest, while the Av Beth Din was a Pharisaic tanna).

See also
 List of High Priests of Israel
 Samaritan High Priest

Notes

References

External links

The Mysterious White Garments of Yom Kippur
Burial artifact inscribed 'Son of High Priest' found near West Bank fence route

Ancient Jewish history
Hebrew Bible words and phrases
 
Jewish sacrificial law
Orthodox rabbinic roles and titles
Religious leadership roles
Book of Exodus
Establishments in the Achaemenid Empire